The Chinese Encyclopedia is a modern Chinese encyclopedia. It was published in the Republic of China from 1981 until 1983. It comprises 10 volumes and 38 categories, with more than 15,000 entries. Most of the editors were from Chinese Culture University and Zhonghua Xueshuyuan in Taiwan. An online version was published in 1999.

See also
 Chinese Wikipedia

References

External links
Chinese Encyclopedia Online

Chinese online encyclopedias
Education in Taiwan
1981 non-fiction books
Chinese encyclopedias
20th-century encyclopedias